The Charter of the Arab League (also known as the Pact of the League of Arab States) is the founding treaty of the Arab League. Concluded in 1945, the agreement aims to strengthen relations and improve cooperation in various areas between signatory Arab countries, while also respecting and preserving their sovereignty. The internal regulations of the Council of the Arab League and the committees were agreed to in October 1951. Those of the Secretary-General were agreed to in May 1953.

Since then, governance of the Arab League has been based on the duality of supra-national institutions and the sovereignty of its member states. Preservation of individual statehood derived its strengths from the natural preference of ruling elites to maintain their power and independence in decision making. Moreover, the fear of the richer that the poorer may share their wealth in the name of Arab nationalism, the feuds among Arab rulers, and the influence of external powers that might oppose Arab unity can be seen as obstacles towards a deeper integration of the league.

Initial signatories

The Charter was concluded on 22 March 1945 by the governments of Syria, Transjordan, Iraq, Saudi Arabia, Lebanon, Egypt, and North Yemen. A state joins the Arab League by ratifying the Pact.

According to the Charter, "the League of Arab States shall be composed of the: independent Arab States that have signed this Pact."

Forms of government 
The member states of the Arab League represent all forms of government, including monarchies, both absolute and constitutional, as well as republics.

Autonomous entities

Officially, Iraqi Kurdistan is the only autonomous entity in the Arab League, but several countries view Palestine as an autonomous entity within Israel. The Palestinian Authority exercises certain sovereign powers within its borders, but is not a fully independent government. The Palestinian Authority administrated territories are internationally recognized as occupied by Israel. The Arab League on the other hand recognizes the State of Palestine as a fully independent state, with Jerusalem as its capital and with embassies in all of the other League member states, with the exception of Somalia.

References

External links
League of Arab States

Arab League
Treaties of the Syrian Republic (1930–1963)
Treaties of the Emirate of Transjordan
Treaties of the Kingdom of Iraq
Treaties of Saudi Arabia
Treaties of the Kingdom of Egypt
Treaties of the Mutawakkilite Kingdom of Yemen
Treaties of Lebanon
Treaties of Algeria
Treaties of Morocco
Treaties of the Republic of the Sudan (1956–1969)
Treaties of Tunisia
Treaties of the Somali Republic
Treaties of the United Arab Emirates
Treaties of the Kingdom of Libya
Treaties of Kuwait
Treaties of Mauritania
Treaties of Oman
Treaties of Qatar
Treaties of Bahrain
Treaties of Djibouti
Treaties of the Comoros
Treaties of the State of Palestine
Treaties establishing intergovernmental organizations
1945 in Egypt